The National War Tax Resistance Coordinating Committee (NWTRCC — usually pronounced "new-trick") is an American activist coalition that promotes tax resistance as a way to protest against and/or disassociate from war and militarism.

NWTRCC was founded on September 18, 1982, by Ed Hedemann and other activists. It filled an organizational gap that had been left since the group War Tax Resistance (founded in 1969) dissolved in 1975.

Members of that group, of Conscience and Military Tax Campaign, and of Center on Law and Pacifism, among others, recognized a need to coordinate war tax resistance activities undertaken by a variety of groups in the United States. They published a legal and practical guide for war tax resistance counselors, created a list of nationwide counselors, and organized national gatherings of a diverse variety of war tax resisters.

As the war tax resistance movement in the United States, which had been growing from the 1960s through the 1980s, shrank in the following decades, NWTRCC became less-focused on assisting local, regional, and sectarian war tax resistance groups, and more oriented to being a de facto national war tax resistance organization. The "coordinating committee" part of its name is something of a relic of its inception, as today there are few additional groups to coordinate.

See also
List of anti-war organizations
List of peace activists
Tax resistance in the United States

References

External links
 NWTRCC — organization home page
 30-minute film about War Tax Resisters and their motivations

Tax resistance in the United States